Chanteloup is a commune in the Deux-Sèvres department in the Nouvelle-Aquitaine region in western France.

Etrie castle of Chanteloup was built in the 17th century by the Beauregard family. It has a chapel surrounded by forests and the Libeau meadows. There are deer and hares roaming freely. The Libeau mill now houses a health center and permaculture seed saver organic farm.

See also
Communes of the Deux-Sèvres department

References

Communes of Deux-Sèvres